Luis Paulino Siles Calderón (born December 13, 1941 in San José) is a Costa Rican lawyer, civil engineer and former association football referee. He is known for officiating two matches (Brazil vs Scotland and Poland vs Belgium) in the 1982 FIFA World Cup. He also officiated at the 1980 and 1984 Summer Olympics.

The Apertura tournament of the 2017–18 Liga FPD season was dedicated to him.

References

External links
Profile

1941 births
Sportspeople from San José, Costa Rica
Costa Rican football referees
FIFA World Cup referees
Living people
1982 FIFA World Cup referees
Olympic football referees